Talagune is a village in Sri Lanka. It is located in Central Province. The village has a nice view with surrounded mountains, Terraced paddy fields and a nice water fall named Allegala.

This village is famous for Dumbara Rata Hand Looms. Several families make this hand looms in a traditional way. They mainly target foreign markets to sell their items.

The main Livelihood of residents is farming. They farm rice and vegetables.

Route

Thalagune is approximately 2 hours drive from Kandy and 6 hours drive from Colombo. Go 45 km on Kandy-Mahiyangana road towards to Mahiyangana. Turn left from Udadumbara town. Then go about 3 km on Udadumara-Kalugala road towards to Kalugala.

See also
List of towns in Central Province, Sri Lanka

External links

Populated places in Kandy District